The 2009 Lafayette Leopards football team was an American football team that represented Lafayette College in the 2009 NCAA Division I FCS football season. Lafayette tied for second place in the Patriot League.

The team was led by Frank Tavani, in his 10th season as head coach. The Leopards played their home games at Fisher Stadium in Easton, Pennsylvania.

Schedule

References

Lafayette
Lafayette Leopards football seasons
Lafayette Leopards football